The Oak Ridger is an American daily newspaper published Mondays through Fridays in Oak Ridge, Tennessee. It is owned by Gannett. Its editor and publisher is Darrell Richardson.

The Oak Ridger was established in 1949 by Alfred and Julia Hill. It published its first edition on January 20 of that year. The first publisher was Don J. McKay. The paper was owned for many years by the Hill family. Dick Smyser was its long-time editor. The Hill family sold the paper to Stauffer Communications in 1987. Stauffer sold it to Morris Communications in 1995. In 2007, Morris sold The Oak Ridger to GateHouse along with 13 other American newspapers.

References

External links
 
 GateHouse Media

1949 establishments in Tennessee
Anderson County, Tennessee
Newspapers published in Tennessee
Oak Ridge, Tennessee
Newspapers established in 1949
Roane County, Tennessee
Gannett publications